CP — Comboios de Portugal, EPE (CP; English: Trains of Portugal) is a state-owned company which operates passenger trains in Portugal. Before June 2009, CP stood for Caminhos de Ferro Portugueses (English: Portuguese Railways) although the company has been using its current designation as a brand name since 2004.

In 2019, CP transported 145 million passengers, 19 million more than in 2018.

History
On 28 October 1856, the first railway line was inaugurated in Portugal, between Lisbon and Carregado: the Companhia dos Caminhos de Ferro Portugueses was born. The network was gradually expanded both south of the Tagus and to the north of the country, as well as in the metropolitan areas of Lisbon and Porto and to Spain. During the second half of the 20th century, much of CP's rolling stock was built in Portugal by Sorefame - notably carriages with stainless steel bodywork.

Gradually, electrification was put in place for a little less than half the network. In 1975, the company was nationalised, and its name was shortened to CP, A plan to finally connect all the district capitals by a fully electrified double line was to be implemented from 2010. Part of this plan is based on the Swiss Rail 2000 model.

Manuel Antunes Frasquilho served as Chairman of the Board of directors between 1996 and 1997.

The Vouga line is now the only narrow gauge line left in operation.

Infrastructure

The infrastructure of the Portuguese network is managed by Infraestruturas de Portugal, usually abbreviated to IP

Portuguese railway network extent:
 Narrow gauge (metre gauge) :  not electrified.

Organisation
CP is split into three divisions:
 CP Longo Curso, long-distance mainline services (Alfa Pendular, Intercidades and International trains).
 CP Regional, regional services (Interregional and Regional).
 CP Urban Services
 CP Lisboa, Lisbon's suburban network.
 CP Porto, Porto's suburban network.
 CP Coimbra, Coimbra's suburban network.

Services
CP offers the following types of trains:
 International (IN) is the service that connects Portugal with Spain and France. These are the Sud-Express (Lisbon-Hendaye), Lusitânia (Lisbon-Madrid) and Celta (Porto-Vigo). Both Sud Express and Lusitânia are night trains that run under Renfe's Trenhotel (Hotel Train) brand.
Alfa Pendular (AP) is the fastest service, whose speeds can reach 220 km/h. This service runs from Lisbon to either Porto, Braga or Guimarães (passing through Coimbra, Aveiro and Porto) or between Porto and Faro. 
Intercidades (IC) is a fast long-distance service whose speeds can reach 200 km/h. All IC services (apart from the Beja Shuttle) run from Lisbon to either Porto, Braga, Guimarães, Guarda, Covilhã or Évora (with connection at Casa Branca to Beja), serving the majority of the Portuguese regions.  Service to southern Portugal runs to cities including Tunes, Faro, and Albufeira.
Inter-Regional (IR) is a medium distance service which stops only at the main stations. Runs mainly on the routes Porto-Viana do Castelo-Valença (Minho Line), Porto-Régua-Pocinho (Douro Line), Lisbon-Caldas da Rainha-Leiria-Coimbra (West Line) and Lisbon-Tomar (North Line). Services are operated by the same trains as Regional service.
Regional (R) is CP's local service, stopping at all stations, out of the Lisbon and Porto suburban areas.
Urbano (U) is the CP's urban service, in the regions of Lisbon and Porto and in the Coimbra-Figueira da Foz Line.

The network
CP's flagship service, introduced in 1999, is the Alfa Pendular which operates between Braga - Porto - Lisbon - Faro, with a maximum operating speed of 220km/h (138mph) with FIAT/Siemens tilting trains. As of 2006, CP's network reaches most of the country.

CP inaugurated new trains in suburban service in the 1990s for Lisbon's Suburban service, and in 2001 in Porto's Suburban service.

Lines/Routes
The lines are no longer maintained by CP, due to EU regulations, so the infrastructure is now handled by the public company Infraestruturas de Portugal.

Current Rolling Stock

Locomotives

Multiple Units

Passenger Cars

Major stations

Lisbon
Cais do Sodré - for local trains from Lisbon to Cascais. Portugal's busiest interchange station (train/ferry/metro/tram/bus)
Oriente - for trains to the north and to the Algarve
Rossio - for local trains to Sintra
Santa Apolónia - terminus station, for trains to the north and to Spain

Porto
Campanhã - Porto's main station, including use by Alfa Pendular high speed trains
São Bento - city centre terminus, for local services, northbound and Douro line trains

Other 
Braga
Faro

Accidents and Incidents 
On the 21st of January 2013, two trains crashed on the Portuguese Northern Line in Alfarelos. 25 people were injured and the line was closed for 3 days.

On the 31st of July 2020, an Alfa Pendular Train collided with a track maintenance vehicle at Soure, Portugal. Two people were killed and 43 were injured, three seriously.

See also

History of rail transport in Portugal
Iberian gauge
Narrow gauge railways in Portugal
National Railway Museum (Portugal)
Rail transport in Portugal
High-speed rail in Portugal

References

External links

 CP Official website
 REFER Official website

Comboios de Portugal
Rail transport companies of Portugal
Companies based in Lisbon
Government-owned companies of Portugal
1951 establishments in Portugal
Portuguese brands
Railway companies established in 1951